Ace of Clubs is a 1925 American silent Western film directed by J.P. McGowan and starring Al Hoxie, Peggy Montgomery and Jules Cowles.

Plot summary 
Jack Horton's (Al Hoxie) father and brother have been murdered. Horton is searching for the killer, with his only clue being the Ace of Clubs he found pinned to their bodies.

Upon visiting McGill's newly arrived niece, Jack finds two decks of cards in which the club aces are missing. Having been spotted by McGill's men who were rustling the Horton cattle, he apparently becomes the next victim when a club ace is placed on his unconscious body.

Cast
 Al Hoxie as Jack Horton
 Peggy Montgomery as June McGill - Sandy's Niece
 Andrew Waldron as Sandy McGill
 Minna Redman as The Widow Horton 
 Jules Cowles as Jake McGill
 Mutt as Mutt - the Dog
 Frank Ellis as Horton Cowhand
 Slim Whitaker as Horton Cowhand

Release 
Although some sources date the release of this film as 1925, The American Film Institute Catalog of Motion Pictures Produced in the United States dates it as 1926.

Critical reception 
According to A Guide to Silent Westerns, several film historians consider Ace of Clubs to be poorly written, miscast, and one of the worst westerns ever made.

See also 

 List of American films of 1925

References

External links
 

1925 films
1925 Western (genre) films
American black-and-white films
1920s English-language films
Films directed by J. P. McGowan
Rayart Pictures films
Silent American Western (genre) films
1920s American films